Joseph-Édouard Caron (10 January 1866 – 16 July 1930) was a Canadian politician.

He was a member of the 10th, 11th, 12th, 13th, 14th, 15th, 16th, and 17th Legislative Assembly of Quebec representing the ridings of L'Islet and Îles-de-la-Madeleine. From 1909 to 1929, he was the Minister of Agriculture.

References
 
 

1866 births
1930 deaths
Quebec Liberal Party MLCs
Quebec Liberal Party MNAs
Members of the Executive Council of Quebec